"The Coon Rolled Down and Ruptured his Larinks, a Squeezed Novel by Mr. Skunk" is a 1990 science fiction novelette by American writer Dafydd ab Hugh.

Background
The book was originally published in Isaac Asimov's Science Fiction Magazine in August 1990, and subsequently republished in The Year's Best Science Fiction: Eighth Annual Collection (edited by Gardner Dozois), in  "Best New SF 5" (also edited by Dozois), and in Nebula Awards 26 (edited by James K. Morrow).

The story is set in a post-apocalyptic world where all animals have acquired human-level intelligence and the ability to speak – and all humans have become intellectually disabled.

The title is a reference to the Xhosa language tongue twister, "Iqaqa laziqikaqika kwaze kwaqhawaka uqhoqhoqha" (translated: "The skunk rolled down and ruptured its larynx").

Reception
The Encyclopedia of Science Fiction describes "The Coon Rolled Down and Ruptured his Larinks, a Squeezed Novel by Mr. Skunk" as 'striking' and compares its 'linguistic invention' to that of Riddley Walker.

In 1991, "Ruptured" was nominated for both the Hugo Award for Best Novelette and the Nebula Award for Best Novelette.

References

External links 
 

Science fiction short stories
Works originally published in Asimov's Science Fiction
1990 short stories